LBC Movement presents Beach City (also known as Beach City) is Mixtape by American West Coast hip hop recording group formed by Snoop Dogg LBC Movement. It was released on November 5, 2015 via the DatPiff. The mixtape is hosted by DJ Drama.

Track listing 

 Mixed and Mastered by Dave Fore. Produced by James Massey.

References 

Snoop Dogg albums
2015 albums
Albums produced by Scoop DeVille
Doggystyle Records albums
West Coast hip hop albums